Kuugjuaq is an Inuit language name and may refer to:

 Churchill, Manitoba, a town on the West shore of Hudson Bay in Manitoba, Canada
 Perry River (Nunavut), a waterway in the Kitikmeot Region of Nunavut, Canada

See also
 Kuujjuaq, Nunavik region of Quebec, Canada
 Kuujjuaq (Inuit reserved land), Nunavik region of Quebec, Canada